Neil McInnes (born 1928) is a Scottish born former United States international lawn and indoor bowler.

McInnes won a silver medal in the 1976 World Outdoor Championships in Johannesburg with his bowls partner Dick Folkins. He was born in Glasgow and moved to California in 1970.

He made eighteen United States Championship appearances, winning three singles titles and seven pairs titles and was a carpenter by trade.

References

American male bowls players
Sportspeople from Glasgow
American carpenters
British emigrants to the United States
1928 births
Living people